María Fernanda Castillo García (born 24 March 1982), known as Fernanda Castillo, is a Mexican actress. She is best known for her roles as Daniela Montalvo in Destilando amor, Luisa Barrera in Teresa, co-starring Angelique Boyer and Sebastián Rulli, and more recently as Mónica Robles in El Señor de los Cielos.

Career 
Castillo since she was small she became interested in acting, which led her to be a classical and jazz dancer at a young age. She studied at the Centro de Educación Artística of Televisa for three years and graduated in 2003, almost immediately was named "Chica E! Entertainment" which earned her being known in the medium. In 2003 it she was named "El rostro de El Heraldo" and it was the image of the Acapulco Festival. That same year she plays Camila in the telenovela Clap, el lugar de tus sueños, although previously she had already appeared in other telenovelas as Mi destino eres tú, Las vías del amor, and in the series Mujer, casos de la vida real. After finishing Clap, el lugar de tus sueños, she dedicated herself to doing musical theater.

In 2005, she acted in the film Corazón marchito, which ends up premiering until 2007. In 2006, she joined Cabaret as a dancer, and later she did casting for Nacho Cano's musical work, Hoy no me puedo levantar, staying with the lead role, giving life to the character of María. She had a short participation in the telenovela La fea más bella. In 2007, she alternates her work in theater when she joins the cast of the telenovela Destilando amor. In 2008 she had a small participation in Gael García's first film as director, Déficit. In that same year, after finishing the season of Hoy no me puedo levantar, she is invited to participate in the Spanish production of the same staging, so she goes to live in Spain. After being away from Mexico for several years and away from telenovelas, in 2010 she participated in the series Mujeres asesinas in the episode "Eliana, Cuñada", and later joined the cast of Teresa, version of the telenovela of 1959. In this project she played Luisa de la Barrera Azuela, sister of the protagonist.

In 2011 she appeared in the series Como dice el dicho in the episode "No todo lo que brilla es oro...", and later concluded his contract with Televisa participating in the telenovela Amor bravío. In 2013 she joined the Spanish-speaking network Telemundo, where she joins the cast of the telenovela El Señor de los Cielos, where she played Mónica Robles, after which she was nominated for several awards and won 2 Premios Tu Mundo as Favorite Lead Actress.
 In 2016 she has a special participation in the series El Chema, where she played again Mónica Robles. In 2017 she had a special participation in the telenovela La Fan, and in that same year concludes her participation in the series El Señor de los Cielos.

In 2018 she gets her first leading role in the film Una mujer sin filtro, a Mexican adaptation of the Chilean film No Filter. Later in that same year, she gets her first leading role in the telenovela Enemigo íntimo, which she starred with Raúl Méndez, with whom she previously worked in El Señor de los Cielos. And subsequently, she appears in the films Sacúdete las penas, and Ya veremos, where she shares credits with Mauricio Ochmann. And finally to end the year she starred with Jorge Salinas the film Mi pequeño gran hombre. In 2019, she starred in the film Dulce familia, where she had to gain weight to play the main character.

More recently, she had signed an overall deal with Pantaya, whereas the actress would star in the streamer's upcoming projects.

Filmography

Film roles

Television roles

Awards and nominations

References

External links 

 

Living people
1982 births
Mexican telenovela actresses
Actresses from Sonora
Mexican film actresses
21st-century Mexican actresses
People educated at Centro de Estudios y Formación Actoral
People from Hermosillo